The 1998 Gerry Weber Open was a men's tennis tournament played on outdoor grass courts. It was the 6th edition of the Gerry Weber Open, and was part of the International Series of the 1998 ATP Tour. It took place at the Gerry Weber Stadion in Halle, Westfalen, Germany, from 8 June through 15 June 1998. Second-seeded Yevgeny Kafelnikov won his second consecutive singles title at the event.

Finals

Singles

 Yevgeny Kafelnikov defeated  Magnus Larsson 6–4, 6–4
 It was Kafelnikov's 2nd singles title of the year and the 15th of his career.

Doubles

 Ellis Ferreira /  Rick Leach defeated  John-Laffnie de Jager /  Marc-Kevin Goellner 4–6, 6–4, 7–6

References

External links
 Official website 
 ITF tournament edition details

 
Gerry Weber Open
Halle Open
1998 in German tennis